Carina Lilly Berg, during a time Luuk, (born 11 November 1977) is a Swedish comedian and television presenter. Berg grew up in Åkersberga, studied the aesthetics program at Danderyds gymnasium and then went on to study radio at Kaggeholms folkhögskola. She used to be married to and has a son with Kristian Luuk, who she met in 2005 when they shared presenter duties for the TV4 show God natt, Sverige, Berg's television debut. Along with Christine Meltzer she won a Kristallen-award in 2015 for "Best female television presenter". Berg is since December 2018 married to footballer Erik Berg.

Career

Radio career 
Berg began her media career at radio after finishing her studies, she started at Sveriges Radios local station in Västernorrland and then progress to presenting Morgonpasset for Sveriges Radio P3 along with Peter Erixon between 2003 and 2005. She was also a sidekick in the radio show Lantz i P3 with Annika Lantz. In 2008 and early 2009 she worked for Mix Megapol on the show Äntligen helg med Breitholtz och Berg along with Daniel Breitholtz.

In 2010 and early 2011 she worked on podradio along with Breitholtz for the magazine Yourlife. Along with Jenny Strömstedt she did the podradio broadcast Strömstedt & Berg for TV4.se and TV4 Play.

TV career

After making her unofficial television debut in 2004 as a disabled reporter for CP-magasinet at SVT and her later role in God natt, Sverige, Berg in 2006 presented the comedy show Lilla vi (tar stor plats...) on TV4.

In 2007, she presented Förkväll at the same channel. During late 2007 she presented Idol 2007 along with Carolina Gynning, they presented the audition part of the show. In 2008 the duo presented Stjärnor på is at TV4. The same year she was voted "Best female television presenter" during a vote by fourteen TV-bosses for Aftonbladet.

In 2009, she presented the show Snillen snackar on Kanal5. Berg presented the celebrity show Berg flyttar in for five seasons, in every episode she moved into different celebrities homes during a few days. The show aired between 2008 and 2012.

After this show Berg decided to start working for Kanal5. There she presented The Voice in 2012, and in 2013 she presented the talk show Bergs bärbara talkshow. In 2014 she and Christine Meltzer presented the show Berg & Meltzer i Amerika were the duo travels through USA during two months and visits interesting personalities. The show got a second season in 2015 where the duo travels through European countries.

In 2019 and 2020, Berg and her second husband footballer Erik Berg took part in the reality series Bergs drömkåk which is broadcast on Kanal5.

Personal life
Carina Berg was married with Kristian Luuk in 2008, the couple divorced in 2017. The couple have one child, a son, together. In 2018, Berg married footballer Erik Berg. The couple have son born December 2019  and in March 2021 the couple gave birth to a daughter.

Television work
2004 – CP-magasinet
2005 – God natt, Sverige
2006 – Lilla Vi (tar stor plats...)
2006–2007 – Förkväll
2007 – Idol 2007
2008 – Stjärnor på is
2008–2012 – Berg flyttar in
2009 – Snillen snackar
2012 – The Voice
2013 - Bergs bärbara talkshow
2014 – Berg & Meltzer i Amerika
2015 – Berg & Meltzer i Europa
2015 - Ett jobb för Berg

References

External links 

1977 births
Living people
Swedish television hosts
Swedish women television presenters